Agadallanka is a village in Eluru district in the state of Andhra Pradesh in India. The nearest train station is Gundlakamma located at a distance of 12.38 km.

Demographics

 India census, Agadallanka has a population of 7195 of which 3707 are males while 3488 are females. The average sex ratio of Agadallanka village is 941. The child population is 759, which makes up 10.55% of the total population of the village, with sex ratio 931. In 2011, the literacy rate of Agadallanka village was 69.66% when compared to 67.02% of Andhra Pradesh.

See also 
 Eluru district

References 

Villages in Eluru district